is a Japanese women's professional shogi player ranked 1-kyū.

Kirari's older sister Nikori is also a women's professional shogi player. The two are the fifth pair of sisters to become women's professionals.

Promotion history
Yamaguchi's promotion history is as follows:

 2-kyū: December 1, 2020
 1-kyū: September 22, 2021

Note: All ranks are women's professional ranks.

References

External links
 ShogiHub: Yamaguchi, Kirari

2005 births
Living people
People from Gifu
Japanese shogi players
Women's professional shogi players
Professional shogi players from Gifu Prefecture